Impostor (German: Hochstapler) is a 1921 German silent film directed by Werner Funck and starring Paul Hartmann and Olga Tschechowa.

The film's sets were designed by the art director Carl R. Reiner.

Cast
 Werner Funck
 Paul Hartmann
 Leonhard Haskel
 Albert Patry
 Olga Tschechowa

References

Bibliography
 Bock, Hans-Michael & Bergfelder, Tim. The Concise Cinegraph: Encyclopaedia of German Cinema. Berghahn Books, 2009.

External links

1921 films
Films of the Weimar Republic
German silent feature films
Films directed by Werner Funck
German black-and-white films